Fight for Tomorrow is an American comic book six-issue limited series by writer Brian Wood and artist Denys Cowan, published from 2002 to 2003 by Vertigo. A trade paperback collecting the six issues was released in January 2008. The last issue featured the Vertigo X sub-imprint logo, in commemoration of Vertigo's tenth anniversary.

The single issues were released digitally on ComiXology from February through April 2017.

Plot summary 
Kidnapped as a boy, Cedric Zhang – raised to fight in competitions – formed a bond with Christy, a young nurse. When she disappears with no explanation, Cedric immerses himself in the violent NYC underworld in an effort to locate her, finding himself back in the horrible world he spent his life trying to escape.

Collected edition

Reception 
Chad Nevett of Comic Book Resources stated that the story is "a very solid read, but a lesser Brian Wood work. There's a reason that it doesn't jump out at many when discussing his body of work".

External links 
 Fight for Tomorrow at Grand Comics Database

References 

2002 comics debuts

2003 comics endings
Comics by Brian Wood (comics)
Martial arts comics
New York City in fiction
Vertigo Comics limited series
Vertigo Comics titles